White Door may refer to
 The White Door, a videogame
 White Door (band), 1980s band Clay Records discography
 "White Door", song (performed by A. Pugacheva) composed by Yury Chernavsky